The INAS 303 is an Indian naval air squadron based at INS Hansa.

History 
Indian Navy had contracted for acquisition of 16 MiG 29K/KUB carrier based fighter aircraft with RAC MiG on 20 January 2004. Aircraft deliveries began in December 2009 and all 16 aircraft of the main contract were delivered and accepted by the Indian Navy. An option clause contract for 29 additional aircraft was also signed on 8 March 2010. The option was exercised, with delivery of the last of these aircraft scheduled for the end of 2016. Based on the exploitation experience, the first MiG-29K frontline squadron was commissioned on 11 May 2013 at INS Hansa, Goa. Capt AD Theophilus was the first Commanding Officer.

References 

Aircraft squadrons of the Indian Navy
Naval units and formations of India